Lindbergia may refer to:
 Lindbergia (gastropod), a genus of gastropods in the family Pristilomatidae
 Lindbergia, a genus of plants in the family Poaceae, synonym of Poa
 Lindbergia, a genus of fishes in the family Nototheniidae, synonym of Lepidonotothen